Halichondriidae is a family of sea sponges belonging to the order Suberitida.
These sponges have a skeleton consisting of dense bundles of spicules occurring in a more or less random pattern.

Genera
The following genera are recognised in the family Halichondriidae:
 Amorphinopsis Carter, 1887
 Axinyssa Lendenfeld, 1897
 Ciocalapata Laubenfels, 1936
 Ciocalypta Bowerbank, 1862
 Cryptax de Laubenfels, 1954
 Epipolasis Laubenfels, 1936
 Halichondria Fleming, 1828
 Hymeniacidon Bowerbank, 1858
 Johannesia Gerasimova, Erpenbeck & Plotkin, 2008
 Laminospongia Pulitzer-Finali, 1983
 Sarcomella Schmidt, 1868
 Spongosorites Topsent, 1896
 Topsentia Berg, 1899
 Vosmaeria'' Fristedt, 1885

References

Halichondrida
Taxa named by John Edward Gray